The 2016–17 Croatian First Football League (officially MAXtv Prva liga for sponsorship reasons) was the 26th season of the Croatian First Football League, the national championship for men's association football teams in Croatia, since its establishment in 1992. The fixtures were announced on 15 June 2016. The season started on 15 July 2016 and finished on 27 May 2017. The league was contested by 10 teams. Rijeka won their first ever title, which broke Dinamo Zagreb's dominance of eleven consecutive titles.

Teams
On 22 April 2016, Croatian Football Federation announced that the first stage of licensing procedure for 2016–17 season was complete. For the 2016–17 Prva HNL, only seven clubs were issued a top level license: Dinamo Zagreb, Hajduk Split, Istra 1961, Lokomotiva, Rijeka, Slaven Belupo and NK Zagreb. These clubs were also issued a license for participating in UEFA competitions. In the second stage of licensing, clubs that were not licensed in the first stage appealed the decision. On 23 May 2016, it was announced that all remaining Prva HNL clubs were granted top level license. Only two teams from Druga HNL acquired the top level license: Cibalia and Šibenik.

The following teams participated in the 2016–17 Prva HNL.

Stadia and locations

Personnel and kits

Managerial changes

League table

Results
Each team plays home-and-away against every other team in the league twice, for a total of 36 matches each played.

First round

Second round

Relegation play-offs
At the end of the season, ninth placed Cibalia qualified for a two-legged relegation play-off tie against Gorica, runners-up of the 2016–17 Croatian Second Football League.

First leg

Second leg

Cibalia won 5–1 on aggregate.

Statistics

Top scorers

Awards

Annual awards

See also
2016–17 Croatian Second Football League
2016–17 Croatian Third Football League
2016–17 Croatian Football Cup

References

External links
Official website 
Prva HNL at UEFA.com

2016-17
2016–17 in European association football leagues
1